DIRFOR stands for Sindacato nazionale dei dirigenti e direttivi forestali, an Italian trade union of the Forestry Police. It is no longer active since December 2016.

Trade unions in Italy
Forestry in Italy